On November 13, 1998, the District of Columbia held a U.S. House of Representatives election for its shadow representative. Unlike its non-voting delegate, the shadow representative is only recognized by the district and is not officially sworn or seated. One-term incumbent Sabrina Sojourner declined to run for reelection and was succeeded by fellow Democrat Tom Bryant.

Primary elections
Primary elections were held on September 15.

Democratic primary

Candidates
 Tom Bryant, non-profit fundraiser and consultant
 Eduardo Burkhart, Chairman of the New Columbia Liberation Organization

Results

DC Statehood Party

Candidate
 David VanWilliams, carpenter and US Army veteran

Results

Other primaries
Primaries were held for the Republican, and Umoja parties but no candidates were on the ballot and only write-in votes were cast.

Other candidates

Green
Social justice activist and writer Mike Livingston was nominated by the DC Green Party. The DC Green Party had only been founded earlier that year and Livingston was among the first Green candidates to appear on the ballot.

General election
The general election took place on November 13. This was the first election contested by the Green Party, which had been founded earlier that year. Livingston exceeded the 7,500 vote threshold needed to achieve ballot access for the Greens in future elections.

Results

References

Washington, D.C., Shadow Representative elections
1998 elections in Washington, D.C.